Luis Ganoza Ríos (6 February 1921 – 17 May 2001) was a Peruvian athlete. He competed in the men's pole vault at the 1948 Summer Olympics.

References

1921 births
2001 deaths
Athletes (track and field) at the 1948 Summer Olympics
Athletes (track and field) at the 1951 Pan American Games
Peruvian male pole vaulters
Olympic athletes of Peru
Place of birth missing
Pan American Games competitors for Peru
20th-century Peruvian people